WCNC (1240 AM) is a radio station broadcasting a classic country format. The station is licensed to serve the community of Elizabeth City, North Carolina and is owned by East Carolina Radio.

During the 1960s, 1970s, and early 1980s, this station was adult contemporary.

In 1984, owner Joe Lamb sold the station to former DJ Hunt Thomas, who flipped it to Oldies. The oldies format was not successful, and in 1988, Thomas was forced to file for Chapter 11 bankruptcy, and WCNC had to sign off. The station remained dark until 1990 when former owner Lamb took possession of the station and signed it back on with an Easy Listening / Big band format.

In the mid-nineties the station was purchased by East Carolina Radio who flipped it to a News/Talk format. Later the format was changed to Music of Your Life and WZBO (Edenton, North Carolina)  aired the same programming. But in 2006 seeing the increase of Hispanic residents in the area, the station flipped to a syndicated Spanish language music programming service called La GranD.

References

External links
 East Carolina Radio website

CNC